The 2005–06 Bulgarian Cup was the 66th season of the Bulgarian Cup. CSKA Sofia won the competition, beating Cherno More Varna 3–1 in the final at the Vasil Levski National Stadium in Sofia.

First round
In this round entered winners from the preliminary rounds together with the teams from B Group.

|-
!colspan=3 style="background-color:#D0F0C0;" |25 October 2005

|-
!colspan=3 style="background-color:#D0F0C0;" |26 October 2005

|-
!colspan=3 style="background-color:#D0F0C0;" |2 November 2005

|}

Second round
This round featured winners from the First Round and all teams from A Group. 

|-
!colspan=3 style="background-color:#D0F0C0;" |9 November 2005

|-
!colspan=3 style="background-color:#D0F0C0;" |10 November 2005

|-
!colspan=3 style="background-color:#D0F0C0;" |11 November 2005

|-
!colspan=3 style="background-color:#D0F0C0;" |30 November 2005

|}

Third round

|-
!colspan=3 style="background-color:#D0F0C0;" |10 December 2005

|-
!colspan=3 style="background-color:#D0F0C0;" |14 December 2005

|-
!colspan=3 style="background-color:#D0F0C0;" |22 March 2006

|}

Quarter-finals

|-
!colspan=5 style="background-color:#D0F0C0;" |12 April 2006

|}

Semi-finals

|-
!colspan=5 style="background-color:#D0F0C0;" |3 May 2006

|}

Final

Details

References

2005-06
2005–06 domestic association football cups
Cup